Mariehem SK  (Mariehem sportklubb, MSK) is a Swedish football team from Mariehem in Umeå currently playing in Division 2 Norrland after finishing 8th in 2009.

Background

Mariehem SK was formed in 1974 and currently has 28 teams including junior teams (13 women's and girl's teams and 15 men's and boys teams). The club has its own artificial turf pitch called MSK Arena. The club succeeded in 2007 to win their leagues with three of the Senior teams. Mariehem SK's women's team won the Division 3 Västerbotten, Mariehem FF (farm team to the women's team) won the Division 4 Västerbotten and Mariehem SK's men, despite being newcomers, won Division 3 Southern Norrland and moved up to Division 2, where they have played since. The club is affiliated to the Västerbottens Fotbollförbund.

MSK is, and has long been, Umeå football's main nursery. A number of local players have Mariehem SK as the parent club, for example Anton Holmberg (UCD), Mikael Dahlberg (Umeå FC and GIF Sundsvall) and Hanna Ljungberg (Umeå IK).

The club also arranges Umeå Football Festival, which is Sweden's fourth largest football cup competition for children and youth players.

Season to season

Attendances

In recent seasons Mariehem SK have had the following average attendances:

Squad

Staff members 2014
  Hamdija Comic – Coach
  Peter Hägglöv – Coach
  Christer Öttenius – Equipment Manager

Footnotes

External links
 Official website

Association football clubs established in 1974
Football clubs in Västerbotten County
1974 establishments in Sweden